The Revolt is an Israeli Jewish far-right terror group responsible for the Duma arson attack. The group is opposed to Zionism, and instead advocates for dismantling the State of Israel in order to establish a Kingdom of Israel that follows Jewish Law. The group's membership numbers in the range of 30-40 people. Between the founding of the ideological origin of the group in 2013, and the Duma arson attack, the group was responsible for 11 other arson attacks. The origin of the name comes from the manifesto of the group, which details their ideology for overthrowing the State. According to Aviad Mendelboim writing for ynet "The most extreme group that emerged as part of the new Jewish terror is Kvutzat Ha'mered organization (the rebel group)—the members of which held the banner in support of the defendants during the Duma trial." which consists of dozens of members that identify with Meir Ettinger, the author of the manifesto "The Revolt". Many of the group's members are affiliated with the Hilltop Youth.

As of 2017, the group is still active, in what the Shin Bet is calling “the second generation of the infrastructure of the revolt.”

Citations 

Monarchist organizations
Jewish religious terrorism
Religious terrorism
Monarchism in Israel
Terrorism in Israel
Organizations established in 2013
2013 establishments in Israel
Anti-Zionist organizations
Conservatism in Israel